The Italian Tennis Championships are the national championships in tennis, organised every year by the Federazione Italiana Tennis (FIT) from 1895 to 2004 and in 2020.

Not disputed for 15 editions from 2005 to 2019, its come back in 2020.

Winners

References

External links
 All winners from 1960 to 2005

 
 

Tennis
Tennis tournaments in Italy
Recurring sporting events established in 1895
National tennis championships